Mohammad Rafi Barekzay (born 6 June 1990) is an Afghan footballer who plays as a midfielder for Toofaan Harirod F.C. in the Afghan Premier League.

Career

Toofaan Harirod F.C.
In 2012, Barekzay joined Afghan team Toofaan Harirod F.C. He did get shirtnumber 7 and played as midfielder. He won the Afghan Premier League one time in 2012 with Toofaan Harirod F.C.  since the competition started.

Champions
Toofaan Harirod F.C. won the first season and earned $15,000, defeating Simorgh Alborz F.C. 2–1 in the final match of the tournament, the first season of the league in the country. They also outplayed De Spin Ghar Bazan F.C. by a margin of 10–0 to advance to the Final. This gave them the confidence towards their success in the final. Large numbers of supporters of both teams and officials from the government, came together in the stadium to watch the final match. Those who came, included: Dr. Abdullah Abdullah, the Governing body of Afghanistan Football Federation and others.

International career
He made his debut in a friendly match against Tajikistan in 2013. He played since 2014 8 games for the National Team of Afghanistan and scored 1 goal.

Honours

Toofan Harirod FC
Afghan Premier League: 2012

Afghanistan
SAFF Championship: 2013

References

1990 births
Living people
Sportspeople from Herat
Afghan men's footballers
Afghanistan international footballers
Association football midfielders